Passive Me, Aggressive You (Remixes & B-Sides) (stylised as Passive Me • Aggressive You (Remixes + B-Sides)) is the first compilation album by New Zealand indie electronic band The Naked and Famous. Released on 15 April 2013, the album contains remixes and B-sides from their debut studio album, Passive Me, Aggressive You (2010), along with the song "A Source of Light", a collaboration with New Zealand duo Kids of 88.

Background
Thom Powers, guitarist and vocalist for the band stated that because some of their tunes mysteriously vanished, and that some parts of the world were unable to procure some of their songs, that this album was a way to package all of the rare and unheard tracks.

Track listing

Personnel
Credits adapted from the digital booklet of Passive Me, Aggressive You (Remixes & B-Sides).

The Naked and Famous
 Aaron Short
 Alisa Xayalith
 David Beadle
 Jesse Wood
 Thom Powers

Visuals and imagery
 Special Problems – artwork, design, video

Technical and production
 Thom Powers – production, engineering (disc 1)
 Aaron Short – production, engineering (disc 1)
 Oliver Harmer – additional engineering (disc 1)
 Billy Bush – mixing (disc 1)
 Sam McCarthy – mixing (track: 4, disc 1)
 Jordan Arts – mixing (track: 4, disc 1)
 Emily Lazar – mastering (disc 1)
 Joe LaPorta – mastering (disc 1)
 Angus McNaughton – mastering (disc 2)

Managerial
 Paul McKessar – management
 Campbell Smith – management
 Peter Lewit – legal

Release history

References

2013 compilation albums
2013 remix albums
B-side compilation albums
Fiction Records compilation albums
Fiction Records remix albums
The Naked and Famous albums